The Workers Party of Barbados was a Marxist political party in Barbados. The party was established on 1 May 1985 by George Belle and contested the 1986 elections, when it presented two candidates. The party received just 40 votes, failed to win a seat, and did not run in any further elections.

Electoral history

References

External links
George Belle

Political parties established in 1985
Barbados, Workers Party of Barbados
Defunct political parties in Barbados
1985 establishments in Barbados